Moorside High School, is a coeducational secondary school located in Swinton, Salford, near Manchester, England.

Established in 1934, the school was located on the south side of the East Lancashire Road, to the south of Swinton town centre within the Salford Local Authority before being completely rebuilt in recent years.

History
The school was originally located between the East Lancashire Road and Wentworth Road in Swinton.

In November 2007, England footballer Phil Neville visited the school by helicopter to thank pupils for supporting the New Children's Hospital Appeal. The school held a 20-minute question and answer session with Neville before being given a brief presentation about the New Children's Hospital Appeal.

In 2008 the school was granted special status in Mathematics and Computing. The school continues to improve in all aspects of the curriculum.

In 2008, a former deputy headteacher, Paul Simpson, 53, suffered a heart attack as he took part in a five-a-side game at Falinge Park High School, in Rochdale. He was rushed to Rochdale Infirmary, where he died.

The school was rebuilt between 2011 and 2013 with trees being removed from the Deans playing field and a new entrance from the East Lancashire Road. The new buildings opened in September 2013. Moorside Primary School is located on the same site in a purpose built part of the main building.

Previously a community school administered by Salford City Council, in April 2018 Moorside High School converted to academy status. The school is now sponsored by Consilium Academies.

In October 2018, teachers at the school who were members of the NASUWT union, took part in five days of industrial action in protest at "adverse management culture".

Admissions
Like all schools in Salford LEA, it is for ages 11–16 with no sixth form, because it is Local Authority run there is no exam to pass to gain entry into the school, local pupils are automatically placed into the nearest high school. However, if they wish to attend a certain high school they must complete the relevant forms and send them to Salford City Council as early as they can before the following academic year as places at the school are limited to 1,050. As of 2017 the school has 1,051 pupils attending. Moorside Primary School is the main feeder school locally with St Peter's CE Primary School in Swinton also being a feeder school in the area.

Notable former pupils

Notable past pupils include:
British actress Raffey Cassidy attended the school between 2013 and 2016, where she then moved to another school in the area. 
English composer Peter Maxwell Davies who attended between 1939 and 1944.
Former Manchester United footballer Ryan Giggs who attended between 1985 and 1990
Former CITV presenter Danielle Nicholls, who attended between 1990 and 1995
British mathematician Jonathan Keating
Former Wigan RL player Harrison Hansen who attended between 1997 and 2002
Hollyoaks actress Jorgie Porter who attended between 1999 and 2004
Actor & former CBBC Presenter Chris Johnson who attended between 2002 and 2007
Dave Robinson 1960s/1970s RL forward with Swinton, Wigan, Lancashire and Great Britain, born 1 August 1944

References

External links 
Official Website
 	

Secondary schools in Salford
Academies in Salford
Educational institutions established in 1934
Swinton, Greater Manchester
1934 establishments in England